Claudio Paulino Villanueva Flores (born August 3, 1988) is an Ecuadorian racewalker. He placed 45th in the men's 50 kilometres walk at the 2016 Summer Olympics.  He won the 2017 Pan American Race Walking Cup 50 kilometres race walk. In 2019, he competed in the men's 50 kilometres walk at the 2019 World Athletics Championships held in Doha, Qatar. He did not finish his race.

He represented Ecuador at the 2020 Summer Olympics.

References

1988 births
Living people
Ecuadorian male racewalkers
Olympic athletes of Ecuador
Athletes (track and field) at the 2016 Summer Olympics
Athletes (track and field) at the 2018 South American Games
Athletes (track and field) at the 2019 Pan American Games
Pan American Games gold medalists for Ecuador
Pan American Games medalists in athletics (track and field)
Pan American Games gold medalists in athletics (track and field)
Medalists at the 2019 Pan American Games
Athletes (track and field) at the 2020 Summer Olympics